Usha Narayanan, born Tint Tint (1922 — 24 January 2008), was the First Lady of India from 1997 to 2002. She was married to K. R. Narayanan, the tenth President of India.  Upon her husband's assumption of the presidency, Usha Narayanan became India's first foreign-born first lady. She played a key role in women social welfare activities initiated by the presidency.

Early life 
Usha Narayanan was born as Tint Tint in 1922, in Yamethin, Burma. She attended Rangoon University, earning a Bachelor of Arts degree. Thereafter, she worked as a lecturing tutor at the Department of Burmese Language and Literature. She continued her graduate studies at the Delhi School of Social Work through a scholarship, earning a Master of Arts degree with a specialty in juvenile delinquency.

Later life 
While working in Rangoon, Burma (now Myanmar), K. R. Narayanan met Tint Tint, whom he later married in Delhi on 8 June 1951. Ms Tint Tint was active in the YWCA and on hearing that Narayanan was a student of Laski, approached him to speak on political freedom before her circle of acquaintances. While K. R. Narayanan and Tint Tint had been born in the same country, the British colony of India, by the time they met they had different citizenship. Their marriage needed a special dispensation from Jawaharlal Nehru per Indian law, because Narayanan was in the IFS and she was a foreigner. Ms Tint Tint adopted the Indian name Usha and became an Indian citizen.

Usha Narayanan worked on several social welfare programs for women and children in India and had completed her Masters in Social Work from Delhi School of Social Work. She also translated and published several Burmese short stories; a collection of translated stories by Thein Pe Myint, titled Sweet and Sour, appeared in 1998.

They have two daughters, Chitra Narayanan (former Indian ambassador to Switzerland, Liechtenstein and The Holy See) and Amrita Narayanan.

She died at the age of 86 on 24 January 2008 at 5:30 pm, at Sir Ganga Ram Hospital.

See also
 Spouse of the President of India
 List of spouses of vice presidents of India

References

1922 births
2008 deaths
People from Mandalay Region
First ladies and gentlemen of India
Second ladies and gentlemen of India
Burmese emigrants to India
Naturalised citizens of India
Indian people of Burmese descent
University of Yangon alumni
Burmese social workers
Burmese translators
Indian social workers
Indian women translators